The Key to the City is a symbol of the Freedom of the City presented by a town or city's municipal government to esteemed residents or visitors whom the city wishes to honour. The award, usually an ornamental key, is generally presented by the mayor or some other public figure at an award ceremony. Some cities allow visiting celebrities to request that a key be granted to them, a practice which has resulted in some controversy.

Alberta

Calgary
The local equivalent is the White Hat ceremony, which was begun in the 1950s by Mayor Donald Hugh MacKay. The first white felt cowboy hat was given to the Mayor of Toronto, Hiram E. McCallum, as thanks for his hosting during the 36th Grey Cup (1948). The honour can be requested through Tourism Calgary; white hatting ceremonies are also conducted for individual tourists and groups by a volunteer corps at the Calgary International Airport. Past recipients include:
 1969: Karol Wojtyła, Archbishop of Kraków (later elected Pope John Paul II) 
 1969: Prince Philip
 1977: Prince Charles and Prince Andrew
 July 9, 2001: Ralph Goodale, Minister of Natural Resources from 1997 to 2002, and Ernesto Martens, Mexico's Secretary of Energy 
 June 27, 2002: The eight world leaders attending the 28th G8 summit – Tony Blair, Jacques Chirac, Vladimir Putin, Gerhard Schröder, Silvio Berlusconi, Junichiro Koizumi, Jean Chrétien, and George W. Bush
 March 3, 2003: Phil McGraw, as "Dr. Phil" 
 March 16, 2005: Dave Bautista and Chris Benoit, WWE wrestlers 
 June 4, 2006: Prince Edward
 July 25, 2008: Ozzy Osbourne, rock performer, and Sharon Osbourne, music producer 
 July 2009: David Petraeus, U.S. General 
 September 30, 2009: Tenzin Gyatso, the 14th Dalai Lama 
 October 13, 2009: David Jacobson, U.S. Ambassador to Canada 
 December 4, 2009: Tommy Chong
 May 13, 2010: Princess Margriet of the Netherlands
 June 19, 2011: William Shatner, Canadian actor, musician, singer, author, film director, spokesman and comedian
 July 7, 2011: Prince William and Catherine, the Duke and Duchess of Cambridge 
 November 3, 2012: Tommy Tallarico, creator of Video Games Live, Laura Intravia, singer-flutist, and Christopher Tin, composer
 September 24, 2015: Trooper, Canadian rock band 
 Robert Duvall
 Kevin Costner
 Luciano Pavarotti
 Oprah Winfrey

Edmonton
 Wayne Gretzky, Canadian Hockey Player.

British Columbia
Municipalities in British Columbia grant the freedom of the city, rather than a key, to individuals worthy of recognition. In accordance with Section 158 of the Community Charter, potential recipients must receive the unanimous support of the city council before they are granted the Freedom, which is then usually bestowed upon them during a special ceremony.

In the following list, where the date of the award ceremony is unknown, the date of the council resolution is given instead. These dates are marked with (res.).

Burnaby
 June 14, 1968: George Pearkes, 20th Lieutenant Governor of British Columbia
 April 14, 1978: Bob Prittie, former mayor of Burnaby 
 April 3, 1987: Eileen Dailly, former Deputy Premier and Minister of Education 
 April 6, 1990: James Gibson Lorimer, politician 
 2010: Michael J. Fox, actor

City of North Vancouver
 March 21, 1966 (res.): George Pearkes, 20th Lieutenant Governor of British Columbia
 September 13, 1966 (res.): Jack Loutet, former mayor of North Vancouver 
 March 4, 1968 (res.): Nancy Greene, alpine skier 
 January 18, 1971 (res.): John Henry Cates, Canadian MLA, and his wife, Carrie, a former mayor 
 April 8, 2002 (res.): Ray Perrault, former Senator 
 June 14, 2010: Lauren Woolstencroft, Paralympic skier

Comox
 16 August 2017: John Marinus, Former Comox Town Councillor.

Coquitlam
The City of Coquitlam grants the freedom of the city rather than a key.

 Fern Bouvier
 Donald Cummings
 Reverend John Davies
 Dorothy Fleming
 Larry Fleming
 Rene Gamache
 Dr. J. Crosby Johnston
 Jean Lambert
 Robert McNary
 Eunice Parker
 Leonore Peyton

District of North Vancouver
 March 3, 1973: Karen Magnussen, World Figure Skating Champion 
 June 9, 2008: Don Bell, former mayor

Kelowna
The City of Kelowna Awards The Freedom of the City instead of a key.

 December 8, 1952: W. A. C. Bennett, 25th Premier of British Columbia

Oliver
 15 September 2017: Clarence Louie , Chief of the Osoyoos Indian Band 1985–present.

Vancouver
Unless otherwise specified, the source of the items on this list is the City of Vancouver's official website.

 August 28, 1936: Edward Wentworth Beatty, President of the Canadian Pacific Railway
 April 11, 1938: Lauchlan Alexander Hamilton, civil engineer and Alderman 
 January 4, 1939 (res.): R. B. Bennett, 11th Prime Minister of Canada
 June 30, 1941 (res.): William Lyon Mackenzie King, 10th Prime Minister of Canada
 September 29, 1941 (res.): Eric Hamber, 15th Lieutenant Governor of British Columbia
 January 2, 1946 (res.): Harry Crerar, military general
 December 23, 1946 (res.): William Culham Woodward, 16th Lieutenant Governor of British Columbia
 March 17, 1947 (res.): William Harold Malkin, 21st Mayor of Vancouver
 November 3, 1949: Jawaharlal Nehru, Prime Minister of India 
 December 1, 1952 (res.): George Clark Miller, 23rd Mayor of Vancouver
 November 16, 1953 (res.): J. S. Matthews, archivist and historian 
 December 17, 1963 (res.): Jonathan Webster Cornett, 25th Mayor of Vancouver
 December 17, 1963 (res.): George T. Cunningham, founder of the pharmacy chain Cunningham's
 December 30, 1963 (res.): Frederick Hume, 28th Mayor of Vancouver
 December 29, 1964 (res.): Charles Edwin Thompson, 27th Mayor of Vancouver
 December 29, 1964 (res.): Henry Herbert Stevens, politician and businessman
 February 17, 1965 (res.): W. A. C. Bennett, Premier of British Columbia
 December 29, 1965 (res.): Arnold Webster, politician
 December 20, 1966 (res.): H. R. MacMillan, Chair of the Vancouver Board of Trade
 January 16, 1968 (res.): Frank Mackenzie Ross, 19th Lieutenant Governor of British Columbia
 August 27, 1968 (res.): George Pearkes, 20th Lieutenant Governor of British Columbia
 October 1, 1968 (res.): William Mark Duke, former Archbishop of Vancouver
 December 17, 1968 (res.): Clarence Wallace, 18th Lieutenant Governor of British Columbia
 December 16, 1970 (res.): Prentice Bloedel, creator of the Bloedel Reserve
 January 11, 1972 (res.): Howard Charles Green, politician
 January 11, 1972 (res.): Whitford Julian VanDusen, businessman and philanthropist
 April 10, 1973 (res.): Harold Edward Winch, politician and former Leader of the Opposition
 July 23, 1974 (res.): Grace MacInnis, politician
 August 27, 1974 (res.): Arthur Laing, former leader of the British Columbia Liberal Party
 December 17, 1976 (res.): John Robert Nicholson, 21st Lieutenant Governor of British Columbia
 March 14, 1978 (res.): Jean Coulthard, composer
 April 24, 1979 (res.): Jack Diamond, businessman and philanthropist
 June 11, 1985 (res.): John Lecky, Olympic rower
 January 7, 1986 (res.): Henry Pybus Bell-Irving, 23rd Lieutenant Governor of British Columbia
 January 7, 1986 (res.): Walter Koerner, businessman and philanthropist 
 March 24, 1987 (res.): Rick Hansen, Paralympian
 April 29, 1988: Cecil Howard Green, geophysicist and Texas Instruments founder 
 July 12, 1988 (res.): Nathaniel Nemetz, lawyer and judge
 February 4, 1989: Jack Shadbolt, artist 
 June 16, 1992 (res.): Thomas R. Berger, politician and jurist
 September 2, 1993 (res.): The Vancouver Foundation
 September 28, 1993 (res.): David Lam, 25th Lieutenant Governor of British Columbia
 April 12, 1994: George Woodcock, author and critic 
 May 28, 2002 (res.): Arthur Erickson, architect
 November 5, 2002 (res.): Kim Campbell, 19th Prime Minister of Canada
 October 6, 2005 (res.): Dal Richards, musician
 July 6, 2010: Art Phillips, 32nd Mayor of Vancouver 
 February 23, 2011: Jim Green, councillor
 July 12, 2011: Milton Wong, businessman and philanthropist 
 October 30, 2015: Dr. David Suzuki CC OBC, Canadian academic, science broadcaster and environmental activist.
 November 8, 2016: Margaret Mitchell OBC, Canadian Politician and Vancouver East MP 1979–1993.
 February 28, 2017: Michael Harcourt, Mayor of Vancouver 1981-1986 Premier of British Columbia 1991–1996.

Victoria
 March 9, 1927: Freeman Freeman-Thomas, 13th Governor General of Canada
 June 19, 1928: Robert Pim Butchart, founder of Butchart Gardens
 February 5, 1959: Frank Mackenzie Ross, 19th Lieutenant Governor of British Columbia
 November 19, 1965: George Pearkes, 20th Lieutenant Governor of British Columbia
 October 13, 1966: Robert Mayhew, businessman and politician 
 October 15, 1970: W. A. C. Bennett, Premier of British Columbia

West Vancouver
 May 31, 1990 (res.): Pierre Savard, former mayor of Verdun
 September 8, 2003 (res.): Allan Williams, former Attorney General of British Columbia
 October 5, 2009: Gordon A. Smith, artist

Manitoba

Winnipeg
 Foster Hewitt, radio broadcaster for Hockey Night in Canada
 2002: Shannen Doherty, actress 
 2002: Shirley MacLaine, actress 
 August 24, 2007: Milt Stegall, football player for the Winnipeg Blue Bombers 
 December 3, 2008: Bob Geldof, musician-activist 
 March 14, 2010: Jon Montgomery, Olympian 
 March 28, 2010: Henry Winkler, actor 
 July 11, 2010: Jonathan Toews
 June 15, 2011: Gene Simmons, KISS rocker, during his visit for a question-and-answer event at the Centennial Concert Hall 
 September 12, 2011: Steve Nash
 October 19, 2012: Twyla Tharp, choreographer 
 August 12, 2013: Paul McCartney, musician 
 October 21, 2016: Teemu Selanne , NHL Player

New Brunswick

Saint John
 May 18, 1933: R. B. Bennett, 11th Prime Minister of Canada

Newfoundland and Labrador

St. John's
St. John's Awards the Freedom of the City Rather than a Key.

May 22, 1968: Bernard Montgomery, 1st Viscount Montgomery of Alamein
October 10, 1970:  Irish Ambassador Joseph Shields, Alderman D.C. MacLean, Provost of Ayr, Scotland,  Alan O. Will, OBE of Bristol, England, Henry G.R. Mews
August 31, 1977: Andrew Crosbie
September 11, 1997: Paul Johnson
May 28, 2000: Drum Major William Tilley, Major Walter Learning, CM, Colonel Adrian Heffernan
May 12, 2001: World Junior Championship Curling Team (Brad Gushue, Mark Nichols, Brent Hamilton, Mike Adam, Jamie Korab, Jeff Thomas)
November 15, 2004: Dr. Paul O'Neill
September 30, 2008: Dr. Nigel Rusted
June 24, 2010: John J. Murphy

 May 19, 2016: Elinor Gill Ratcliffe CM ONL, Canadian Philanthropist.

Ontario

Brampton

 Anthony Bennett, Brampton-raised basketball player, after being drafted first overall in the 2013 NBA Draft, July 1, 2013
 George "Potsy" Burrows, Brampton war veteran, Ontario Lacrosse Hall of Fame inductee, and 1997 Brampton Citizen of the Year, June 16, 2013
 Michael Collins
 William G. Davis by Mayor Patrick Brown, November 25, 2019
 Akshay Kumar
 Jonathan Osorio
 Russell Peters
 Tyler Seguin, after his Stanley Cup win, July 31, 2011 
 Tristan Thompson

Previously, the Corporate Calling Committee had a "Key to the City", to give to "thank the local businesses by giving them 
a token of the City’s appreciation". Michael Collins of the Brampton Real Estate Board resigned later that meeting, and was presented with the first token.

Kingston
June 18, 2013: Vicki Keith, marathon swimmer 
February 4, 2014: 424 Squadron SAR crew 
December 7, 2016: Arthur B. McDonald, for his contributions to modern physics and the Kingston community

London
 27 August 2022: Nazem Kadri, hockey player 2022 Stanley Cup Champion (first ever Muslim to win the cup).

Mississauga

 Bianca Andreescu, tennis player, after her 2019 US Open – Women's Singles Championship, September 15, 2019
 Rik Emmett of Triumph in November 2019
 Mohamad Fakih, owner of Paramount Fine Foods, philanthropist
 Walter Kawiecki, for work with Civitan Club
 Mike Levine of Triumph in November 2019
 Lawrence Loh, Medical Officer of Health for the Region of Peel during the COVID-19 pandemic, in March 2022 
 Hazel McCallion CM, Mayor of Mississauga 1978–2014, April 12, 2017
 Gil Moore of Triumph in November 2019

Niagara Falls
 February 25, 2022: Erika Casupanan, winner of Survivor 41.

Ottawa
 November 4, 1935: John Buchan and Susan Buchan (Lord and Lady Tweedsmuir) 
 March 9, 1948: Barbara Ann Scott, after winning the figure skating gold medal at the 1948 Summer Olympics
 September 8, 1951: Denys Lowson, Lord Mayor of London 
 October 12, 1951: Princess Elizabeth, Duchess of Edinburgh, four months before her accession to the throne 
 February 9, 1952: Harold Alexander, the Governor General of Canada, upon leaving office 
 1954: Queen Elizabeth The Queen Mother, former royal consort and mother to Queen Elizabeth II.
 October 5, 1955: Prime Minister Louis St. Laurent and eight provincial premiers – Leslie Frost (Ontario), Maurice Duplessis (Quebec), W. A. C. Bennett (British Columbia), Hugh John Flemming (New Brunswick), Douglas Lloyd Campbell (Manitoba), Henry Hicks (Nova Scotia), Alexander Wallace Matheson (Prince Edward Island), and Ernest Manning (Alberta) – during a First Ministers' conference
 December 12, 1956: George A. Drew, former leader of the Progressive Conservative Party, upon his retirement 
 April 7, 1961: Harold Macmillan, former British Prime Minister 
 October 24, 1973: Bill Westwick, sportswriter for the Ottawa Journal, at a testimonial dinner held in the Château Laurier
 August 1974: Rich Little, impressionist 
 December 10, 1984: Marc Garneau, the first Canadian in space 
 October 13, 1994: Dan Aykroyd, comedian and actor 
 March 8, 1996: Alanis Morissette, musician 
 June 6, 2005: Aga Khan IV, Imam (spiritual leader) of the Ismaili Muslims and founder of the Aga Khan Development Network (AKDN)
 May 16, 2006: Dominic D'Arcy, the "Singing Policeman" 
 May 29, 2007: The Commanding Officer of HMCS Ottawa
 July 8, 2013: Sandra Oh, actor 
 March 5, 2015: Daniel Alfredsson, retired Ottawa Senators captain 

May 11, 2017: Algonquin College, 50 year anniversary.

Peterborough
 30 June 2014: Corey Perry, Canadian Hockey Player
Ronnie Hawkins, Ada Lee

Sault Ste. Marie
 30 June 2017: Dr. Roberta Bondar , Canadian Astronaut.

Timmins
 1947: Barbara Ann Scott
 Shania Twain, Canadian Singer.

Toronto
 June 7, 1998: Mickey Rooney
 July 26, 1998: Ed Mirvish
 1998: Bobby Curtola
 1998: Sheldon Kennedy
 1998: Bobby Rahal
 1998: Charles Adler
 1998: Nelson Mandela
 1998: Barbara Ann Scott-King
 1998: Johnny Lombardi
 April 15, 1999: Norman Jewison  
 September 17, 1999: Celine Dion
 October 5, 1999: Joe Foti
 1999: Yo-Yo Ma
 1999: David L. Gunn
 1999: Mickey Mouse
February 29, 2000: David Boothby, Chief of Police 
 March 30, 2000: Neil Young and Donald Sutherland
 September 21, 2000: Barenaked Ladies, a Canadian pop band 
 October 23, 2000: J.K. Rowling, author of the Harry Potter series of books
 2000: Sharon, Lois & Bram
 2000: Archbishop Desmond Tutu
 2000: Constantinos Stephanopoulos, President of the Hellenic Republic of Greece 
 2000: Pramukh Swami Maharaj
 October 16, 2001: Margaret Atwood and Joni Mitchell
 November 18, 2001: Jackie Chan, action movie star, during a charity event 
 December 2001: Blue Rodeo, a Canadian alt-country band
 2001: Boris Spremo
 2001: Constantine II of Greece
 2001: Sylvester Stallone
 2001: Sophia Loren
 2002: Tiger Woods
 July 31, 2002: Thomas Rosica
 October 4, 2002: Ronnie Hawkins
 2002: Muhammad Ali
 September 19, 2003: Nickelback
 June 25, 2003: Mike Myers
 July 28, 2003: The people of Prince Edward Island
 July 28, 2003: The Rolling Stones
 July 31, 2003: Anson Carter
 2003: Case Ootes, deputy mayor 
 April 14, 2005: Julian Fantino, former Police Chief 
 October 23, 2010: Tenzin Gyatso, the 14th Dalai Lama 
 June 21, 2012: George Cohon, founder of McDonald's in Canada 
 March 26, 2013: George Chuvalo, Canadian heavyweight boxer 
 August 20, 2013: Doug Holyday, former deputy mayor 
February 12, 2016: Drake, Toronto native rapper
July 22, 2017: Mahant Swami Maharaj
June 17, 2019: The 2019 Championship Winning Toronto Raptors team.

Windsor

 May 9, 2009: Windsor Spitfires Major Junior ice hockey team, for winning the J. Ross Robertson Cup
 July 1, 2010: Joel Quenneville, Stanley Cup Winning NHL Head Coach.
 November 7, 2012: Richie Hawtin, English-Canadian Electronic Musician.
 November 17, 2014: Eddie Francis, Mayor of Windsor.
 Jimmy Carter, Former President of the United States.
 Bill Clinton, Former President of the United States.
 Roger Penske, Auto Racing Team Owner.
 HRH Prince Michael of Kent, Member of the British Royal Family.

Markham
 June 27, 2010: 883 Air Commodore Leonard Birchall Air Cadet Squadron and 351 Silverstar Air Cadet Squadron

Quebec

Montreal
 1999: Céline Dion, Canadian singer
 2005: Sœur Angèle, celebrity chef. 
 2011: Anthony Calvillo, Montreal Alouettes Quarterback.
 2014: Michel Drucker, French TV host.
 2015: Raymond Benjamin, secretary general of the International Civil Aviation Organization.
 2015: Al Pacino
 2016: William Shatner
 2019: Greta Thunberg, Swedish environmental activist, after the September 2019 climate strike.

Saskatchewan

Regina
 October 2014: Weston Dressler, Saskatchewan Roughriders Player and Grey Cup Champion.

References

+
Keys to the City
Keys to the City